Mysterious Discovery (Russian: Таинственная находка) is a 1953 Soviet family adventure film directed by Boris Buneev.

Plot
Three schoolchildren from a polar settlement find an old gun. Trying to figure out its origin, they learn many interesting things about the history of the region, and the national hero Guria Gagarki.

Cast
In alphabetical order
 Aleksey Alekseev as Stepan Golovin  
 Igor Bezyayev as Nikanor Sarvanov  
 B. Dorochov as Andrei  
 Mikhail Gluzsky as Segey Chernyshev  
 Nikolay Grabbe as British lieutenant  
 Valentin Grachyov as Vasia Golovin  
 Aleksei Gribov as Nikanor Sarvanov  
 Georgi Gumilevsky as Prokhor Brusnichkin  
 Larisa Matvienko as Gagarka's wife  
 Andrei Petrov as Aleksei Golovin  
 Alexandr Pokrovsky as Stepa Brusnichkin  
 Aleksei Pokrovsky as episode
 Nikolai Rybnikov as Sailor  
 Ekaterina Savinova as Ekaterina Sotnikova  
 A. Shmurakova as Luda  
 Nikolay Smorchkov as Sailor 
 Aleksandr Susnin as Anton  
 Yevgeny Teterin as British captain  
 Andrei Tsimbal as Geologist  
 Yan Yanakiyev as Sailor 
 Gennadi Yudin as Guriy Gagarka

References

Bibliography 
 Natalja Čemodanova /  Alfred Krautz. International Directory of Cinematographers, Set-And Costume Designers in Film: Soviet Union. Saur, 1995.

External links 
 

1953 films
1953 adventure films
Soviet adventure films
1950s Russian-language films
Gorky Film Studio films